Joe Wong (born February 16, 1970) is a Chinese American biochemist and comedian.

Background
He was born in Baishan, Jilin, China, into an ethnic Korean family. His ancestors had emigrated from Korea three generations previously.  He graduated from Jilin University and studied a master degree at the Chinese Academy of Sciences, before he went to further study chemistry at Rice University in Texas in 1994.  He graduated from Rice in 2000 with a PhD in Biochemistry.

Career
Wong moved to Boston in 2001 and began to perform his comedy at All Asia Bar, at Stash's Comedy Jam.  Although he had won numerous awards, he did not attract American nationwide attention until after his appearance on Late Show with David Letterman on April 17, 2009. His multiple appearances on TV, courtesy of Ellen DeGeneres, boosted his reputation further.  On February 10, 2010, Wong made his second appearance on the Late Show, and appeared again on March 30, 2012. He returned to the Late Show with Stephen Colbert on December 14, 2018.

On St. Patrick’s Day, 2010, he headlined the annual dinner hosted by the Radio and Television Correspondents' Association.  On June 19, 2010, he placed first in the Third Annual Great American Comedy Festival.

In 2013, he moved back to Beijing, hosting television shows, such as Is it true?, a MythBusters-like program, on China Central Television.

Awards

References

External links
Twitter account

1970 births
Living people
American male comedians
21st-century American comedians
American stand-up comedians
American people of Korean descent
Chinese emigrants to the United States
Chinese people of Korean descent
Rice University alumni
Jilin University alumni
People from Baishan
People from Boston
Scientists from Jilin
Chinese comedians
China Central Television